Evil Clutch is a 1988 Italian horror film written and directed by Andrea Marfori. The film is about an American college student who joins her Italian boyfriend for a romantic weekend trip. Along the way, they pick up a voluptuous female hitchhiker who turns out to be a maniacal demon with a ferocious deadly claw-like hand. The film was shown at the  Brussels International Festival of Fantasy Films and in Rome at Fantafestival in 1988. It was not distributed theatrically in Italy or the United States where it was distributed by Eagle Home Video and Troma respectively.

Production
Director Andrea Marfori was a movie buff at an early age and would begin working in documentary and short films in the early 1980s. In April 1987, Marfori began work on a horror short film which the director described as a pre-film for his first feature Evil Clutch. The film was made with an approximate 100 million lire budget with a crew of 20 people and a cast of five. To complete the film, Marfori included footage from his short film Gory Sand.

The film was titled Il bosco 1, with the number one being added as an ironic nod towards the amount of horror film sequels in theatres at the time.

Release
Evil Clutch was shown at the Brussels International Festival of Fantasy Films on March 26, 1988. It was later shown Rome's Fantafestival on June 7.

The film was not released theatrically and released on home video in Italy by Eagle Home Video. It was released in the United States on home video on June 4, 1992 by Troma.

Reception
From contemporary reviews, Gorezone writers Philip Nutman and Mario Cortini found that the film "has some continuity problems. But when have the Italians ever worried about that?"

References

Footnotes

Sources

External links

1988 films
1988 horror films
Italian supernatural horror films
Italian independent films
Troma Entertainment films
1980s Italian films